Viscount de Vesci, of Abbeyleix in the Queen's County, now called County Laois (pronounced "leash"), is a title in the Peerage of Ireland. It was created in 1776 for Thomas Vesey, 2nd Baron Knapton and 3rd Baronet. The title Baron Knapton was created in the Peerage of Ireland in 1750 for the first Viscount's father, John Vesey, 2nd Baronet, who had earlier represented Newtownards in the Irish House of Commons. The baronetcy, of Abbeyleix in the Queen's County, was created in the Baronetage of Ireland on 28 September 1698 for the first Baron's father, Reverend Thomas Vesey, Bishop of Killaloe (1713–1714) and Bishop of Ossory (1714–1730).

The first Viscount's son, the second Viscount, was a Member of the Irish House of Commons for Maryborough. He sat in the House of Lords as an Irish representative peer from 1839 to 1855, and served as Lord Lieutenant of Queen's County between 1831 and 1855. The third Viscount represented Queen's County in the House of Commons as a Conservative and was an Irish representative peer from 1857 to 1875. The fourth Viscount served as Lord Lieutenant of Queen's County from 1883 to 1903.

In 1884, the fourth Viscount was created Baron de Vesci, of Abbey Leix in the Queen's County, in the Peerage of the United Kingdom, which gave him an automatic seat in the House of Lords. However, this title became extinct on his death while he was succeeded in the Irish titles by his nephew, the fifth Viscount. He was an Irish representative peer from 1909 to 1958. On his death the titles passed to his nephew, the sixth Viscount.  they are held by the latter's son, the seventh Viscount, who succeeded in 1983.

The family title of Vesci is pronounced "Vessee" and the family surname of Vesey is pronounced "Veezey".

The family seat was Abbeyleix House, near Abbeyleix, County Laois.

Vesey baronets, of Abbeyleix (1698)
Sir Thomas Vesey, 1st Baronet (died 1730)
Sir John Denny Vesey, 2nd Baronet (died 1761) (created Baron Knapton in 1750)

Baron Knapton (1750)
John Denny Vesey, 1st Baron Knapton (died 1761) 
Thomas Vesey, 2nd Baron Knapton (1735–1804) (created Viscount de Vesci in 1776)

Viscount de Vesci (1776)
Thomas Vesey, 1st Viscount de Vesci (1735–1804)
John Vesey, 2nd Viscount de Vesci (1771–1855)
Thomas Vesey, 3rd Viscount de Vesci (1803–1875)
John Robert William Vesey, 4th Viscount de Vesci (1844–1903) (created Baron de Vesci [UK] in 1884)
Yvo Richard Vesey, 5th Viscount de Vesci (1881–1958) 
John Eustace Vesey, 6th Viscount de Vesci (1919–1983)
Thomas Eustace Vesey, 7th Viscount de Vesci (born 1955)

The heir apparent is the present holder's second son, Hon. Oliver Ivo Vesey (born 1991).

Male-line family tree

Notes and references

Notes

References

Links

Kidd, Charles, Williamson, David (editors). Debrett's Peerage and Baronetage (1990 edition). New York: St Martin's Press, 1990.

Viscountcies in the Peerage of Ireland
1698 establishments in Ireland
Noble titles created in 1776
De Vesci family